Arisztid Dessewffy de Csernek et Tarkő (2 July 1802, in Csákány (present-day Čakanovce, Slovakia) – 6 October 1849, in Arad) was a honvéd general in the Hungarian Army.  He was executed for his part in the Hungarian Revolution of 1848, and is considered one of the 13 Martyrs of Arad. He commanded 100,000 men against Russian troops and surrendered because of the massive size of the encroaching Russian army. By doing so, he spared his men. On the night of his execution, he was said to be sleeping, with no anxiety about his impending death. He was executed around 4 AM by firing squad, along with two others. The Prince of Liechtenstein  intervened at the last minute to spare the three from hanging, which was considered public humiliation.

Life
He was born into the wealthy Hungarian, evangelical Abaúj family. He graduated high school in Kassa (Košice) and Eperjes (Prešov) and, at 18, applied to the Imperial Army 5th (Radetzky) hussar regiment cadets. Over a long period of peace after the Napoleonic wars he served in the fifth Artillery corps of miners and the fifth hussar regiment. However, he did not favor a military career, and thus in 1839 at the rank of captain, decommissioned, got married and began farming in Eperjes. His wife and children all died before the revolution.

After the 1848 revolution broke out he entered military service again on Sept. 22, as a major in the National Guard and was involved in organizing the Saros county militia. On November 26, he was promoted to Lieutenant Colonel and Brigade Commander of the Upper Tisza Corps.

He took part in 11 December battle and was in the engagement. On January 4 of 1849, at the battle of Kassa he was commended for his valour and perseverance in leading his troops against General Schlik with minimal losses. He participated in the reorganization of the Upper Tisza Corps and victoriously fought against the Schleicher Corps.  On February 14, he was promoted to colonel. On 18 February, commanding a small cavalry force, he defeated an Imperial detachment. He distinguished himself in this battle, and the battle of the spring campaign, for which he received the Hungarian Order of Military Merit III on April 18, and on April 30 was appointed commander of the I Corps cavalry division. The Corps was present at the siege of Budapest. On June 2 he was given command of the IX Corps, and also received the appointment of major general.

On 5 July, he married a second time, to Emma Szinnyei Merse. Beginning in July, he was tasked as the top cavalry commander to hinder the advance of the Russian army. The cavalry were heavily engaged in the July 20 Tura battle. became corps commander. He took part in the August 5 Szőreg battle then again in the August 9 Timișoara battle. He handed over command of the army on August 16 to Colonel William Lazarus.

Death

After the final defeat and surrounding of the army, he had the opportunity to escape to Turkey, but one of his comrades, a Lieutenant-General, encouraged by Prince Franz von Liechtenstein, on 19 August next to Karánsebes laid down their arms before the Imperial troops. They were given terms that the soldiers would be spared but the officers would be subject to military discipline.  General Liechtenstein later pleaded to his comrades at the military court to spare the lives of most, but to no avail; the Arad military court sentenced him to death by hanging. However the prince was able to convince the court to execute them by firing squad, which was seen as less of an insult since it was a military death rather than a criminal one.  He was executed in the second group of four in front of a firing squad.

The executed were buried around the Arad castle. His body was later exhumed by his family and moved from the castle in secret. His body has been resting at the Margonyai estate since 1850.

References

1802 births
1849 deaths
People from Košice-okolie District
People executed by the Austrian Empire
Arisztid
The 13 Martyrs of Arad
Executed Hungarian people